Chahar Borj (also Romanized as Chahār Borj and Chehār Borj) is a village in Daman Kuh Rural District, in the Central District of Esfarayen County, North Khorasan Province, Iran. At the 2006 census, its population was 1,996, in 509 families.

References 

Populated places in Esfarayen County